The 2020 2nd Silverstone FIA Formula 3 round was a motor racing event held on 8 and 9 August 2020 at the Silverstone Circuit, Towcester, United Kingdom. It was the fifth round of the 2020 FIA Formula 3 Championship, and ran in support of the 70th Anniversary Grand Prix.

Classification

Qualifying 
The Qualifying session took place on 7 August 2020, with Logan Sargeant scoring his second successive pole position.

Feature Race 

 Notes：

  - Clément Novalak received a five-second time penalty for going off track at Turn 15 and gaining an advantage.
  - Matteo Nannini was handed a three-place grid drop for Race 2, for making contact with Sebastián Fernández at Turn 15.

Sprint Race 

 Note：

  - Enzo Fittipaldi was handed a five second time penalty for gaining an unfair advantage on Cameron Das.

Standings after the event 

Drivers' Championship standings

Teams' Championship standings

 Note: Only the top five positions are included for both sets of standings.

See also 

 70th Anniversary Grand Prix
 2020 2nd Silverstone Formula 2 round

References

External links 
Official website

|- style="text-align:center"
|width="35%"|Previous race:
|width="30%"|FIA Formula 3 Championship2020 season
|width="40%"|Next race:

Silverstone
2020 in British motorsport
2020 in British sport